The men's 5000 metres event at the 2003 Summer Universiade was held on 29 August in Daegu, South Korea.

Results

References

Athletics at the 2003 Summer Universiade
2003